Aniruddha Himanshu Roy (born 15 March 1983) is an Indian former cricketer. He played four first-class matches for Bengal in 2003.

See also
 List of Bengal cricketers

References

External links
 

1983 births
Living people
Indian cricketers
Bengal cricketers
Cricketers from Kolkata